Katuwana Fort ( Katuwana Balakotuwa; ; also known as Fort Catuna or Fort Catoene), is an inland fort constructed by the Dutch in 1646.

The Dutch generally built forts along the coastal areas to protect strategic harbours and anchorages from other colonial forces, such as the Portuguese. They did however construct some forts inland, primarily to defend the coastal lowland areas from attacks by the Kingdom of Kandy.

It was diagonal in shape, with two bastions, which each accommodated six cannon, as a result it was often described as a redoubt rather than a fort.

In 1761 during the 'Matara Rebellion' the fort was captured by Kirti Sri Rajasinha's Kandyan forces and partly destroyed. Following the anexure of the Kandy Kingdom by the British in 1815 the fort lost its strategic value and was abandoned.

References

Further reading 
 

Dutch forts in Sri Lanka
Forts in Southern Province, Sri Lanka
Buildings and structures in Matara District
1646 establishments in the Dutch Empire
Archaeological protected monuments in Hambantota District
Former properties of the Dutch East India Company
Buildings and structures associated with the Dutch East India Company